Flotsam and Jetsam may refer to:

 Flotsam, jetsam, lagan and derelict, refuse found in the ocean.

Fictional characters 
 Flotsam and Jetsam (The Little Mermaid), two characters in The Little Mermaid
 Flotsam and Jetsam, two police officers in the Hollywood Station series by Joseph Wambaugh

Literature 
 "Flotsam and Jetsam", a chapter of The Two Towers by J. R. R. Tolkien
 "Flotsam and Jetsam", a short story by W. Somerset Maugham

Music 
 Flotsam and Jetsam (band), a thrash metal band from Phoenix, Arizona
 Flotsam and Jetsam (Flotsam and Jetsam album), 2016
 Flotsam and Jetsam (EP), a 2006 EP by Mystery Jets
 "Flotsam and Jetsam", a song by Peter Gabriel from eponymous second album
 Flotsam and Jetsam (Peter Gabriel album), 2019 compilation album

Television 
 "Flotsam and Jetsam" (Being Human), an episode of Being Human
 "Flotsam and Jetsam", an episode of QI

Film 
 Flotsam and Jetsam (film), a 2022 film by Chang Tso-chi

See also
 Flotsam (disambiguation)
 Flotsam Jetsam, a compilation album by Robert Wyatt
 Jetsam (disambiguation)
 Mr. Flotsam and Mr. Jetsam, an Anglo-Australian musical comedy duo of the 1920s and 1930s